Shin Soo-yeon is a South Korean actress and model. She is known for her roles in dramas such as Hi Bye, Mama!, Graceful Family and The World of the Married.

Filmography

Film

Television series

Awards and nominations

References

External links 
 
 
 

2004 births
Living people
21st-century South Korean actresses
South Korean child actresses
South Korean female models
South Korean television actresses
South Korean film actresses
People from Incheon